The Government of Ireland Act 1920 (10 & 11 Geo. 5 c. 67) was an Act passed by the Parliament of the United Kingdom to create two separate parliaments in Ireland: the Parliament of Northern Ireland and the Parliament of Southern Ireland. The Fifth Schedule to this act provided the constituencies for the House of Commons in these two separate parliaments. These same constituencies also replaced those provided in the Redistribution of Seats (Ireland) Act 1918 for representation of Ireland in the House of Commons of the United Kingdom at Westminster. Sinn Féin used these constituencies to elect the Second Dáil (1921–22) and those constituencies in Southern Ireland were used to elect the Third Dáil (1922–23).

Constituencies

Operation of constituencies
The First Dáil had used the constituencies which elected MPs to the House of Commons at the 1918 general election. In May 1921, Dáil Éireann resolved to use the constituencies in the Government of Ireland Act 1920 (in both parts of Ireland). The 1921 elections were used to elect the Second Dáil. This increased the total number of seats in the Dáil from 105 in 1918 to 180 in 1921 (52 in Northern Ireland and 128 in Southern Ireland, subsequently the Irish Free State). Only representatives from Sinn Féin sat in the Dáil. In practice this was confined to 125 TDs representing 130 seats.

Only the Dublin University MPs attended for the intended first meeting of the House of Commons of Southern Ireland, with those elected for Sinn Féin sitting as TDs in Dáil Éireann.

The members elected for Southern Ireland assembled in January to give legal effect to the Anglo-Irish Treaty under the terms of the British government, which had not recognised the Anglo-Irish Treaty Dáil vote. This included the Pro-Treaty Sinn Féin TDs and the four representatives of Dublin University. The 1922 Irish general election was held on the constituencies under this Act.

Under the terms of the Treaty, the Irish Free State left the United Kingdom on 6 December 1922. Therefore, only constituencies in Northern Ireland returned MPs at the 1922 United Kingdom general election held on 15 November, and the Westminster constituencies designated for Southern Ireland were never used.

The 1923 general election was the first election in the Irish Free State, and was contested under the new constituencies in the Electoral Act 1923.

In the House of Commons of Northern Ireland, the constituencies were replaced under the House of Commons (Method of Voting and Redistribution of Seats) Act (Northern Ireland) 1929 with single-seat constituencies elected by first-past-the-post voting. Queen's University of Belfast remained as a four-seat constituency until its abolition in 1969.

The United Kingdom House of Commons constituencies in Northern Ireland were altered by the Representation of the People Act 1948, including the abolition of the Queen's University of Belfast constituency. This took effect at the 1950 general election.

Comparison with 1918 constituencies
Constituencies in the Government of Ireland Act 1920 were defined by reference to one or more constituencies as defined in the Redistribution of Seats (Ireland) Act 1918.

Northern Ireland

Southern Ireland

See also
List of United Kingdom Parliament constituencies in Ireland and Northern Ireland
List of parliamentary constituencies in Northern Ireland
Historic Dáil constituencies
Northern Ireland Parliament constituencies

References

 Northern Ireland Parliamentary Election Results 1921–1972, compiled and edited by Sydney Elliott (Political Reference Publications 1973)

External links
http://www.election.demon.co.uk/stormont/boundaries.html 

Dáil constituencies (historic)
Constituencies of the Northern Ireland Parliament
1920 in Ireland
United Kingdom Acts of Parliament 1920
Acts of the Parliament of the United Kingdom concerning Ireland
Acts of the Parliament of the United Kingdom concerning Northern Ireland